GSHS may refer to:

 Garden Spot High School
 Garner Magnet High School, formerly Garner Senior High School
 George Stephenson High School
 Gibson Southern High School
 Gladstone State High School
 Glenbard South High School
 Glenwood Springs High School
 Grand Saline High School
 Great Sankey High School
 Greenville Senior High School (Greenville, South Carolina)
 Gulf Shores High School
 Gyeonggi Science High School
 Global School-based Student Health Survey, a measure of school violence
 George Steinbrenner High School, Lutz, Florida

See also

 
 
 GS (disambiguation)
 GSH (disambiguation)